The China Science and Technology Museum, established in 1988 in Beijing, China, is "the only comprehensive museum of science and technology at national level in China" according to the official website of the Beijing government.

Museum history
According to China Internet Information Center, the museum was founded in 1988 and expanded in 2000 at a location on the northern section of Beijing's 3rd Ring Road.
Its activities included "popular science exhibitions, Astro-vision film shows, training-based education programs and experiment-based exhibition programs."

In preparation for Beijing's 2008 Summer Olympics, construction of new buildings for the museum began at the Olympic site in 2006. The new museum opened in September, 2009, having been expanded from its previous 40,000 square meters to 48,000 square meters. The previous museum site was closed for several years before undergoing renovation and expansion beginning in 2016. On 15 September 2018, the old science museum reopened as Beijing Science Center.

Museum at Olympic site
The museum at its current site houses both permanent and temporary exhibitions. It has many facilities for science popularization (classrooms, laboratories, lecture halls, etc.) including four special-effect theaters.

Transportation
The museum is located in the Beijing Olympic Village, near the Olympic Green station of the Beijing Subway.

See also
 List of museums in China

References

External links

Official website

Museums in Beijing
Museums established in 1988
1988 establishments in China
Science museums in China
Technology museums in China
Buildings and structures in Chaoyang District, Beijing
Buildings and structures completed in 1988
Museums established in 2000
National first-grade museums of China